Morgan Watkins is a British film, television and stage actor from Camden, London.

Background
Watkins trained at the Royal Academy of Dramatic Art, graduating in 2009.

Career
Watkins played Norman Pike in the BBC television series The Hour and Rottweiler in the 2014 film Kingsman: The Secret Service.

He played Len in the revival of Edward Bond's Saved at the Lyric Hammersmith.

He played George Gissing in the 2016 film The Limehouse Golem.

Selected filmography
2011 Wild Bill
2011 The Hour (TV series)
2013 The Mill (TV series)
2014 Kingsman: The Secret Service
2014 The Hooligan Factory
2014 A Little Chaos
2016 The Limehouse Golem
2017 Silent Witness episode: "Remembrance"
2018 Profile
2018 A Very English Scandal (TV series) - Mike Steele
2019 The Krays' Mad Axeman

References

External sources
 IMDB - Morgan Watkins

English male film actors
English male television actors
English male stage actors
People from the London Borough of Camden
Alumni of RADA
Living people
Year of birth missing (living people)